Acacia smeringa is a shrub belonging to the genus Acacia and the subgenus Lycopodiifoliae. It is native to an area in the Kimberley region of Western Australia.

It flowers during May to June and is most closely related to Acacia dimorpha and Acacia prolata.

See also
List of Acacia species

References

smeringa
Acacias of Western Australia
Taxa named by Alex George